Gao Rou (174 – October or November 263), courtesy name Wenhui, was a Chinese politician of the state of Cao Wei during the Three Kingdoms period of China. He was a younger relative of Gao Gan. He previously served under the warlords Yuan Shao and Cao Cao in the late Eastern Han dynasty.

See also
 Lists of people of the Three Kingdoms

Notes

References

 Chen, Shou (3rd century). Records of the Three Kingdoms (Sanguozhi).
 Pei, Songzhi (5th century). Annotations to Records of the Three Kingdoms (Sanguozhi zhu).

174 births
263 deaths
Cao Wei politicians
Han dynasty politicians from Henan
Officials under Cao Cao
Officials under Yuan Shao
Political office-holders in Henan
Politicians from Kaifeng